Zhao Tianci (born 20 March 1995) is a Chinese footballer currently playing as a goalkeeper for YSCC Yokohama.

Career statistics

Club

Notes

References

External links

1995 births
Living people
Chinese footballers
Chinese expatriate footballers
Association football goalkeepers
J3 League players
Beijing Guoan F.C. players
Guangzhou F.C. players
YSCC Yokohama players
Chinese expatriate sportspeople in Japan
Expatriate footballers in Japan